Bay Settlement Church and Monument is a historic church building and structure located in rural Delaware County, Iowa, southwest of Delhi.  Organized in 1846 as the Upper Bay Church, it was the first Free Baptist Church congregation in Iowa.  They built a log structure for their church the same year, and it served the congregation until this frame, front gable structure was completed in 1873.  A monument to honor their 14 Civil War dead was erected in the cemetery in 1865.  Its dedication in August that year is believed to be the first Memorial Day service in Iowa. Services were held on May 30 in succeeding years.  The church and monument were listed on the National Register of Historic Places in 1977.

References

Religious organizations established in 1846
Churches completed in 1873
Baptist churches in Iowa
Churches in Delaware County, Iowa
National Register of Historic Places in Delaware County, Iowa
Monuments and memorials on the National Register of Historic Places in Iowa
Churches on the National Register of Historic Places in Iowa